(1254–1326) was a Buddhist monk of the Tōfuku-ji Rinzai school and follower of Enni.

References

People of Kamakura-period Japan
Japanese Buddhist clergy
1254 births
1326 deaths